Cazis railway station is a station in Cazis, Switzerland. It is located on the  gauge Landquart–Thusis line of the Rhaetian Railway.

Services
The following services stop at Cazis:

 Chur S-Bahn : hourly service between Thusis and Chur.

References

External links
 
 

Railway stations in Switzerland opened in 1896
Cazis
Railway stations in Graubünden
Rhaetian Railway stations